Country Classics: A Tapestry of Our Musical Heritage is an album by Joey + Rory, released on October 14, 2014. The album was recorded at Beaird Studio in Nashville, and The Farmhouse Studio in Pottsville, Tennessee.

Track listing
 "How's the World Treating You" - 3:04
 "Don't It Make My Brown Eyes Blue" - 2:51
 "I'm Not Lisa" - 3:21
 "Rocky Top" - 3:16
 "Let It Be Me" - 3:27
 "King of the Road" - 2:20
 "If I Needed You" - 3:34
 "I Believe In You" - 4:16
 "Hello Love" - 3:00
 "Coat of Many Colors" - 3:12
 "Paper Roses" - 2:59
 "Back Home Again" - 4:39

Charts

Weekly charts

Year-end charts

References

2014 albums
Joey + Rory albums